Mudfish most commonly refers to all species of Neochanna, native to New Zealand and south-eastern Australia.

Mudfish may also refer to:

Fish
 Bowfin (Amia calva), North America
 Channa or snakehead, a genus of predatory fish in Asia
 Channa striata, a species of snakehead fish in Asia
 Clarias anguillaris, African airbreathing catfish
 Misgurnus, a genus of true loaches found in Europe and Asia
 Orange River mudfish (Labeo capensis), southern Africa
 Parachanna, a genus of snakeheads in tropical Africa
 Protopterus, the genus of four species of lungfish in Africa
 South American lungfish (Lepidosiren paradoxa)

Other uses
 Mudfish, a poetry journal founded by Jill Hoffman

See also 
 Lungfish
 Salamanderfish
 Madfish, a wine label
 Mud Fish Pokémon